Mark Eyking  (born August 30, 1960) is a Canadian politician who served as the Member of Parliament for the riding of Sydney—Victoria from 2000 to 2019 as a member of the Liberal Party.

Early life and education
Eyking was born in Sydney, Nova Scotia. His parents, born in Beverwijk (father) and Moergestel (mother), emigrated from the Netherlands to Canada in 1952. Not being able to travel to their city of preference Vancouver due to a lack of funds, they chose to start a business in olericulture in Sydney, where Eyking was born eight years later. Eyking was educated at the Nova Scotia Agricultural College, where he obtained his Agriculture Business Diploma. Now a resident of Millville, Nova Scotia, Eyking is a farmer by career.

Political career
On October 29, 2000, Eyking won the Liberal nomination in the Sydney—Victoria riding for the 2000 federal election. On November 27, 2000, he defeated New Democrat incumbent Peter Mancini by over 5,000 votes to win a seat in the House of Commons. Eyking was re-elected in the 2004, 2006, 2008, 2011, and 2015 federal elections. In Paul Martin's government, he served as the Parliamentary Secretary to the Minister of Agriculture and Agri-Food with special emphasis on Agri-Food (2003–2004) and Parliamentary Secretary to the Minister of International Trade with special emphasis on Emerging Markets (2004–2006).

He served as the chair of the Standing Committee on International Trade during the 42nd Canadian Parliament. Eyking announced on February 13, 2019 that he wouldn't run for re-election in 2019.

Personal life
His wife Pam represented the riding of Victoria-The Lakes as a Liberal MLA in the Nova Scotia House of Assembly from 2013 to 2017.

Electoral record

References

External links
Official site

Liberal Party of Canada bio

1960 births
Liberal Party of Canada MPs
Living people
Members of the House of Commons of Canada from Nova Scotia
Members of the King's Privy Council for Canada
People from Sydney, Nova Scotia
Canadian people of Dutch descent
Farmers from Nova Scotia
Nova Scotia Agricultural College alumni
21st-century Canadian politicians